Quadrologue at Utopia is a live album by jazz pianist Mal Waldron featuring Jim Pepper recorded in 1989 and released on the German Tutu label.

Reception
Allmusic awarded the album 3 stars.

Track listing
All compositions by Mal Waldron except as indicated
 "Ticket to Utopia" — 20:31 
 "Time for Duke" — 11:35 
 "Never in a Hurry" — 15:38 
 "Mistral Breeze, No. 1" — 10:25 
 "Funny Glasses & A Moustache" (Jim Pepper, Mal Waldron) — 15:50 
Recorded at the Utopia Club in Innsbruck, Austria on October 25 & 26, 1989

Personnel 
 Mal Waldron — piano
 Jim Pepper — tenor saxophone, soprano saxophone 
 Ed Schuller — bass 
 John Betsch — drums

References 

1990 live albums
Mal Waldron albums